Ryszard Łysakowski (7 June 1911 – 31 August 2008) was a Polish footballer. He played in one match for the Poland national football team in 1934.

References

External links
 

1911 births
2008 deaths
Polish footballers
Poland international footballers
Place of birth missing
Association footballers not categorized by position